The men's regu sepak takraw competition at the 2002 Asian Games in Busan was held from 7 October to 9 October at the Minseok Sports Center in Dongseo University.

Squads

Results 
All times are Korea Standard Time (UTC+09:00)

Preliminary round

Group A

|-
|7 October||10:00
|align=right|
|align=center|2–1
|align=left|
|21–9||19–21||15–10
|-
|7 October||10:00
|align=right|
|align=center|0–2
|align=left|
|9–21||18–21||
|-
|7 October||13:00
|align=right|
|align=center|2–0
|align=left|
|21–7||21–10||
|-
|7 October||13:00
|align=right|
|align=center|2–0
|align=left|
|21–16||21–15||
|-
|8 October||10:00
|align=right|
|align=center|2–0
|align=left|
|21–10||21–16||
|-
|8 October||10:00
|align=right|
|align=center|2–0
|align=left|
|21–13||21–14||

Group B

|-
|7 October||11:30
|align=right|
|align=center|2–1
|align=left|
|19–21||21–11||15–10
|-
|7 October||11:30
|align=right|
|align=center|2–0
|align=left|
|colspan=3|Walkover
|-
|7 October||14:30
|align=right|
|align=center|2–0
|align=left|
|21–18||21–19||
|-
|7 October||14:30
|align=right|
|align=center|2–0
|align=left|
|colspan=3|Walkover
|-
|8 October||11:30
|align=right|
|align=center|2–0
|align=left|
|colspan=3|Walkover
|-
|8 October||11:30
|align=right|
|align=center|2–0
|align=left|
|21–16||21–12||

Knockout round

Semifinals

|-
|9 October||10:00
|align=right|
|align=center|2–0
|align=left|
|21–12||21–12||
|-
|9 October||11:30
|align=right|
|align=center|1–2
|align=left|
|23–21||18–21||7–15

Final

|-
|9 October||15:30
|align=right|
|align=center|2–0
|align=left|
|21–14||21–17||

References 

Official Website
2002 Asian Games Official Report, Page 588

Sepak takraw at the 2002 Asian Games